The 2022 World Junior Curling Championships were held from May 15 to 22 at the Jönköping Curling Club in Jönköping, Sweden. The event was originally scheduled to be held March 5 to 12, however, was postponed due to the COVID-19 pandemic in Sweden. It was the final World Curling Federation event held during the 2021–22 curling season.

Medallists

Men

Qualification
The following nations qualified to participate in the 2022 World Junior Curling Championship:

World Junior-B cancellation
The 2022 World Junior-B Curling Championships were intended to be held from January 3 to 14 to qualify the final three nations for the World Junior Curling Championships. However, on January 6, the World Curling Federation was forced to cancel the event due to an outbreak of COVID-19 cases. The three spots from the championship were then awarded to Italy, New Zealand and Norway, who were the highest ranked nations who had not already secured qualification spots.

Russian participation
As part of international sports' reaction to the Russian invasion of Ukraine, on February 28 the World Curling Federation initiated proceedings to remove the Russian Curling Federation from the 2022 Curling Championship, pending until March 3. In its statement the WCF said:
 On March 4, 2022, the WCF announced the removal of the RCF from the 2022 World Curling Championships. Their vacated spot was offered to South Korea, who accepted.

Teams

The teams are listed as follows:

Round-robin standings
Final round-robin standings

Round-robin results

All draw times are listed in Central European Summer Time (UTC+02:00).

Draw 1
Sunday, May 15, 9:00

Draw 2
Sunday, May 15, 19:00

Draw 3
Monday, May 16, 14:00

Draw 4
Tuesday, May 17, 9:00

Draw 5
Tuesday, May 17, 19:00

Draw 6
Wednesday, May 18, 14:00

Draw 7
Thursday, May 19, 9:00

Draw 8
Thursday, May 19, 19:00

Draw 9
Friday, May 20, 14:00

Playoffs

Semifinals
Saturday, May 21, 14:00

Bronze medal game
Sunday, May 22, 9:00

Final
Sunday, May 22, 9:00

Final standings

Women

Qualification
The following nations qualified to participate in the 2022 World Junior Curling Championship:

World Junior-B cancellation
The 2022 World Junior-B Curling Championships were intended to be held from January 3 to 14 to qualify the final three nations for the World Junior Curling Championships. However, on January 6, the World Curling Federation was forced to cancel the event due to an outbreak of COVID-19 cases. The three spots from the championship were then awarded to Latvia, Norway and United States, who were the highest ranked nations who had not already secured qualification spots.

Russian participation
As part of international sports' reaction to the Russian invasion of Ukraine, on February 28 the World Curling Federation initiated proceedings to remove the Russian Curling Federation from the 2022 Curling Championship, pending until March 3. In its statement the WCF said:
 On March 4, 2022, the WCF announced the removal of the RCF from the 2022 World Curling Championships. Their vacated spot was originally offered to Hungary, who declined as they were unable to send a team in time. Their spot was then offered to Scotland, who accepted.

Teams

The teams are listed as follows:

Round-robin standings
Final round-robin standings

Round-robin results

All draw times are listed in Central European Summer Time (UTC+02:00).

Draw 1
Sunday, May 15, 14:00

Draw 2
Monday, May 16, 9:00

Draw 3
Monday, May 16, 19:00

Draw 4
Tuesday, May 17, 14:00

Draw 5
Wednesday, May 18, 9:00

Draw 6
Wednesday, May 18, 19:00

Draw 7
Thursday, May 19, 14:00

Draw 8
Friday, May 20, 9:00

Draw 9
Friday, May 20, 19:00

Playoffs

Semifinals
Saturday, May 21, 19:00

Bronze medal game
Sunday, May 22, 14:00

Final
Sunday, May 22, 14:00

Final standings

References

External links

World Junior Curling Championships
2022 in curling
May 2022 sports events in Sweden
Sports competitions in Jönköping
International curling competitions hosted by Sweden
World Junior Curling Championships, 2022